The 2011 AMNRL season was the fourteenth season of the American National Rugby League. The Jacksonville Axemen are the reigning champions. Prior to the season seven AMNRL teams withdrew from the league to form the new USA Rugby League.

The New York Knights defeated the Connecticut Wildcats in the league's Grand Final on August 20, 2011.

Background
Prior to the season the AMNRL announced its intentions to expand to such places as Chicago, the West Coast of the United States, and the Southeastern United States. Additionally, the Bucks County Sharks, who had suspended operations for the 2010 season, announced that they would be resuming play for 2011. However, on January 12, 2011, seven former AMNRL teams announced they were withdrawing from the competition to form the new USA Rugby League. The AMNRL added a sixth team, the Delaware Vipers, ostensibly based in Delaware, who had such a shaky season that they were dubbed the "Vapours" by some in the league.

Teams

References

AMNRL season
American National Rugby League seasons
2011 in American sports